TV8 (in ), also known as  El-Dhakira TV, is the eighth Algerian public national television channel. It is part of the state-owned EPTV group, along with TV1, TV2, TV3, TV4, TV5, TV6, TV7 and TV9. It is an Arab language channel. TV8 is specialized in Algerian history.

History
TV8 was launched on 12 October 2020, It broadcasts programs related to the history of Algeria, such as documentaries and historical films.

References

External links
  
 

Television in Algeria
21st century in Algerian television
2020 establishments in Algeria